The Democratic Party (DP) is a political party in Sint Eustatius with two seats in the 5-seat island council. In 2011, the party obtained 2 seats in the first elections after Sint Eustatius became part of the Netherlands upon the dissolution of the Netherlands Antilles in 2011. However, their Island Council representative Reuben Merkman left the DP in 2014 and became an independent council member.

Netherlands Antilles
Until the dissolution of the Netherlands Antilles, the party competed in island council elections and in 2002 obtained the single Sint Eustatius seat in the Estates of the Netherlands Antilles (which it won in the 2002, 2006 (uncontested) and 2010 elections).

When Sint Eustatius became part of the Netherlands in 2010, the 2007 island council (where the party obtained 4 of the 5 seats) stayed until the elections under Dutch law in 2011.

References

Political parties in Sint Eustatius
Christian Democratic Appeal